Els Beerten (born 27 March 1959) is a Flemish writer of children's literature.

Career 

Beerten made her debut in 1987 with the book Scènes.

In 2004, she received the Gouden Zoen award for her book Lopen voor je leven.

In 2009, she won the Nienke van Hichtum-prijs, the Boekenleeuw and the Gouden Boekenuil awards for her book Allemaal willen we de hemel (2008), a story that takes place during World War II. She also won the Lavki-prijs voor het Jeugdboek in 2011 and the Prijs van de Vlaamse Gemeenschap voor Jeugdliteratuur in 2013 for this book.

Her books have been illustrated by various illustrators including Kristien Aertssen, Geert Vervaeke and Fred de Heij.

Awards 

 2004: Gouden Zoen, Lopen voor je leven
 2009: Nienke van Hichtum-prijs, Allemaal willen we de hemel
 2009: Boekenleeuw, Allemaal willen we de hemel
 2009: Gouden Boekenuil, Allemaal willen we de hemel
 2011: Lavki-prijs voor het Jeugdboek, Allemaal willen we de hemel
 2013: Prijs van de Vlaamse Gemeenschap voor Jeugdliteratuur, Allemaal willen we de hemel

References

External links 
 Els Beerten (in Dutch), Digital Library for Dutch Literature
 Els Beerten (in Dutch), jeugdliteratuur.org

1959 births
Living people
Belgian children's writers
20th-century Belgian writers
21st-century Belgian writers
20th-century Belgian women writers
21st-century Belgian women writers
Belgian women children's writers
Boekenleeuw winners
Nienke van Hichtum Prize winners